The women's 4 × 400 metres relay event at the 2017 European Athletics U23 Championships was held in Bydgoszcz, Poland, at Zdzisław Krzyszkowiak Stadium on 16 July.

Results

References

4 x 400 metres relay
Relays at the European Athletics U23 Championships